= Sanguthurai =

Village in Tamil Nadu, India

Sanguthurai is a small village in Kanyakumari district, Tamil Nadu, India, near Nagercoil. Sanguthurai beach is situated about 9 km from Nagercoil town. It is a risky beach and waves in the beach are very dangerous. Sanguthurai beach is a sandy beach and it has huge white pillar with black conch built during King Chola period. From this beach you can see Thiruvalluvar statue and Vivekananda rock in a long view. Backwater view in Sanguthurai beach is really looks beautiful.

Sanguthurai Beach is a peaceful and serene destination, ideal for visitors seeking solitude and a relaxing escape from crowded tourist spots. The beach welcomes visitors with its iconic Sangu statue and a sea-view tower, offering panoramic views of the coastline and the surrounding landscape, beautifully adorned with coconut trees. Its tranquil atmosphere and scenic surroundings make it an ideal place to unwind and enjoy nature.
